The blackspot conger (Paraconger macrops) is an eel in the family Congridae (conger/garden eels). It was described by Albert Günther in 1870, originally under the genus Conger. It is a subtropical, marine eel which is known from the eastern Atlantic Ocean, including Madeira and Azores. It dwells at a depth range of 30-100 meters and burrows into sand. Males can reach a maximum total length of 50 centimetres.

References

Congridae
Fish described in 1870
Taxa named by Albert Günther